The Ottoman Empire, historically and colloquially the Turkish Empire, was an empire that controlled much of Southeast Europe, Western Asia, and Northern Africa between the 14th and early 20th centuries. It was founded at the end of the 13th century in northwestern Anatolia in the town of Söğüt (modern-day Bilecik Province) by the Turkoman tribal leader Osman I. After 1354, the Ottomans crossed into Europe and, with the conquest of the Balkans, the Ottoman beylik was transformed into a transcontinental empire. The Ottomans ended the Byzantine Empire with the conquest of Constantinople in 1453 by Mehmed the Conqueror.

Under the reign of Suleiman the Magnificent, the Ottoman Empire marked the peak of its power and prosperity, as well as the highest development of its governmental, social, and economic systems. At the beginning of the 17th century, the empire contained 32 provinces and numerous vassal states. Some of these were later absorbed into the Ottoman Empire, while others were granted various types of autonomy over the course of centuries. With Constantinople (modern-day Istanbul) as its capital and control of lands around the Mediterranean Basin, the Ottoman Empire was at the centre of interactions between the Middle East and Europe for six centuries.

While the empire was once thought to have entered a period of decline following the death of Suleiman the Magnificent, this view is no longer supported by the majority of academic historians. The newer academic consensus posits that the empire continued to maintain a flexible and strong economy, society and military throughout the 17th and for much of the 18th century. However, during a long period of peace from 1740 to 1768, the Ottoman military system fell behind that of its European rivals, the Habsburg and Russian empires. The Ottomans consequently suffered severe military defeats in the late 18th and early 19th centuries. The successful Greek War of Independence concluded with decolonization of Greece following the London Protocol (1830) and Treaty of Constantinople (1832). This and other defeats prompted the Ottoman state to initiate a comprehensive process of reform and modernization known as the Tanzimat. Thus, over the course of the 19th century, the Ottoman state became vastly more powerful and organized internally, despite suffering further territorial losses, especially in the Balkans, where a number of new states emerged.

The Committee of Union and Progress (CUP) established the Second Constitutional Era in the Young Turk Revolution in 1908, turning the Empire into a constitutional monarchy, which conducted competitive multi-party elections. However, after the disastrous Balkan Wars, the now radicalized and nationalistic CUP took over the government in the 1913 coup d'état, creating a one-party regime. The CUP allied the Empire with Germany, hoping to escape from the diplomatic isolation which had contributed to its recent territorial losses, and thus joined World War I on the side of the Central Powers. While the Empire was able to largely hold its own during the conflict, it was struggling with internal dissent, especially with the Arab Revolt in its Arabian holdings. During this time, the Ottoman government engaged in genocide against the Armenians, Assyrians, and Greeks. The Empire's defeat and the occupation of part of its territory by the Allied Powers in the aftermath of World War I resulted in its partitioning and the loss of its southern territories, which were divided between the United Kingdom and France. The successful Turkish War of Independence, led by Mustafa Kemal Atatürk against the occupying Allies, led to the emergence of the Republic of Turkey in the Anatolian heartland and the abolition of the Ottoman monarchy.

Name 

The word Ottoman is a historical anglicisation of the name of Osman I, the founder of the Empire and of the ruling House of Osman (also known as the Ottoman dynasty). Osman's name in turn was the Turkish form of the Arabic name .

The Turkish word for "Ottoman" originally referred to the tribal followers of Osman in the fourteenth century. The word subsequently came to be used to refer to the empire's military-administrative elite. In contrast, the term "Turk" was used to refer to the Anatolian peasant and tribal population and was seen as a disparaging term when applied to urban, educated individuals. The term  was also used to refer to Turkish speakers by the other Muslim peoples of the empire and beyond. As applied to Ottoman Turkish-speakers, this term began to fall out of use at the end of the seventeenth century, and instead of the word increasingly became associated with the Greek population of the empire, a meaning that it still bears in Turkey today.

In Western Europe, the names Ottoman Empire, Turkish Empire and Turkey were often used interchangeably, with Turkey being increasingly favoured both in formal and informal situations. This dichotomy was officially ended in 1920–1923, when the newly established Ankara-based Turkish government chose Turkey as the sole official name. At present, most scholarly historians avoid the terms "Turkey", "Turks", and "Turkish" when referring to the Ottomans, due to the empire's multinational character.

History

Rise 

As the Rum Sultanate declined well into the 13th century, Anatolia was divided into a patchwork of independent Turkish principalities known as the Anatolian Beyliks. One of these beyliks, in the region of Bithynia on the frontier of the Byzantine Empire, was led by the Turkish tribal leader Osman I ( 1323/4), a figure of obscure origins from whom the name Ottoman is derived. Osman's early followers consisted both of Turkish tribal groups and Byzantine renegades, with many but not all converts to Islam. Osman extended the control of his principality by conquering Byzantine towns along the Sakarya River. A Byzantine defeat at the Battle of Bapheus in 1302 contributed to Osman's rise as well. It is not well understood how the early Ottomans came to dominate their neighbors, due to the lack of sources surviving from this period. The Ghaza thesis popular during the twentieth century credited their success to their rallying of religious warriors to fight for them in the name of Islam, but it is no longer generally accepted. No other hypothesis has attracted broad acceptance.

In the century after the death of Osman I, Ottoman rule had begun to extend over Anatolia and the Balkans. The earliest conflicts began during the Byzantine–Ottoman wars, waged in Anatolia in the late 13th century before entering Europe in the mid-14th century, followed by the Bulgarian–Ottoman wars and the Serbian–Ottoman wars waged beginning in the mid 14th century. Much of this period was characterised by Ottoman expansion into the Balkans. Osman's son, Orhan, captured the northwestern Anatolian city of Bursa in 1326, making it the new capital of the Ottoman state and supplanting Byzantine control in the region. The important port city of Thessaloniki was captured from the Venetians in 1387 and sacked. The Ottoman victory in Kosovo in 1389 effectively marked the end of Serbian power in the region, paving the way for Ottoman expansion into Europe. The Battle of Nicopolis for the Bulgarian Tsardom of Vidin in 1396, widely regarded as the last large-scale crusade of the Middle Ages, failed to stop the advance of the victorious Ottoman Turks.

As the Turks expanded into the Balkans, the conquest of Constantinople became a crucial objective. The Ottomans had already wrested control of nearly all former Byzantine lands surrounding the city, but the strong defense of Constantinople's strategic position on the Bosporus Strait made it difficult to conquer. In 1402, the Byzantines were temporarily relieved when the Turco-Mongol leader Timur, founder of the Timurid Empire, invaded Ottoman Anatolia from the east. In the Battle of Ankara in 1402, Timur defeated the Ottoman forces and took Sultan Bayezid I as a prisoner, throwing the empire into disorder. The ensuing civil war, also known as the Fetret Devri, lasted from 1402 to 1413 as Bayezid's sons fought over succession. It ended when Mehmed I emerged as the sultan and restored Ottoman power.

The Balkan territories lost by the Ottomans after 1402, including Thessaloniki, Macedonia, and Kosovo, were later recovered by Murad II between the 1430s and 1450s. On 10 November 1444, Murad repelled the Crusade of Varna by defeating the Hungarian, Polish, and Wallachian armies under Władysław III of Poland (also King of Hungary) and John Hunyadi at the Battle of Varna, although Albanians under Skanderbeg continued to resist. Four years later, John Hunyadi prepared another army of Hungarian and Wallachian forces to attack the Turks, but was again defeated at the Second Battle of Kosovo in 1448.

According to modern historiography, there is a direct connection between the fast Ottoman military advance and the consequences of the Black Death from the mid-fourteenth century onwards. Byzantine territories, where the initial Ottoman conquests were carried out, were exhausted demographically and militarily due to the plague outbreaks, which facilitated the Ottoman expansion. In addition, the slave hunting - executed at first by akinci  irregulars expediting before the Ottoman army - was the main economic driving force behind the Ottoman conquest. Some modern (21st c.) authors re-periodize the Ottoman conquest of the Balkans into the akıncı phase, which spanned 8 to 13 decades, characterized by continuous slave hunting and destruction, followed by the phase of administrative integration into the Ottoman Empire. This theory presumes that the demographical impact of the Black Death was more devastating in Byzantine territories and the Balkans compared to Anatolia, where the bubonic plague pandemic occurred between 1347 and 1349.

Expansion and peak (1453–1566) 

The son of Murad II, Mehmed the Conqueror, reorganized both state and military, and on 29 May 1453 conquered Constantinople, ending the Byzantine Empire. Mehmed allowed the Eastern Orthodox Church to maintain its autonomy and land in exchange for accepting Ottoman authority. Due to tension between the states of western Europe and the later Byzantine Empire, the majority of the Orthodox population accepted Ottoman rule as preferable to Venetian rule. Albanian resistance was a major obstacle to Ottoman expansion on the Italian peninsula. According to modern historiography, there is a direct connection between the fast Ottoman military advance and the consequences of the Black Death from the mid-fourteenth century onwards. Byzantine territories, where the initial Ottoman conquests were carried out, were exhausted demographically and militarily due to the plague outbreaks, which facilitated the Ottoman expansion.

In the 15th and 16th centuries, the Ottoman Empire entered a period of expansion. The Empire prospered under the rule of a line of committed and effective Sultans. It also flourished economically due to its control of the major overland trade routes between Europe and Asia.

Sultan Selim I (1512–1520) dramatically expanded the Empire's eastern and southern frontiers by defeating Shah Ismail of Safavid Iran, in the Battle of Chaldiran. Selim I established Ottoman rule in Egypt by defeating and annexing the Mamluk Sultanate of Egypt and created a naval presence on the Red Sea. After this Ottoman expansion, competition began between the Portuguese Empire and the Ottoman Empire to become the dominant power in the region.

Suleiman the Magnificent (1520–1566) captured Belgrade in 1521, conquered the southern and central parts of the Kingdom of Hungary as part of the Ottoman–Hungarian Wars, and, after his historic victory in the Battle of Mohács in 1526, he established Ottoman rule in the territory of present-day Hungary (except the western part) and other Central European territories. He then laid siege to Vienna in 1529, but failed to take the city. In 1532, he made another attack on Vienna, but was repulsed in the siege of Güns. Transylvania, Wallachia and, intermittently, Moldavia, became tributary principalities of the Ottoman Empire. In the east, the Ottoman Turks took Baghdad from the Persians in 1535, gaining control of Mesopotamia and naval access to the Persian Gulf. In 1555, the Caucasus became officially partitioned for the first time between the Safavids and the Ottomans, a status quo that would remain until the end of the Russo-Turkish War (1768–1774). By this partitioning of the Caucasus as signed in the Peace of Amasya, Western Armenia, western Kurdistan, and Western Georgia (including western Samtskhe) fell into Ottoman hands, while southern Dagestan, Eastern Armenia, Eastern Georgia, and Azerbaijan remained Persian.

In 1539, a 60,000-strong Ottoman army besieged the Spanish garrison of Castelnuovo on the Adriatic coast; the successful siege cost the Ottomans 8,000 casualties, but Venice agreed to terms in 1540, surrendering most of its empire in the Aegean and the Morea. France and the Ottoman Empire, united by mutual opposition to Habsburg rule, became strong allies. The French conquests of Nice (1543) and Corsica (1553) occurred as a joint venture between the forces of the French king Francis I and Suleiman, and were commanded by the Ottoman admirals Hayreddin Barbarossa and Dragut. A month before the siege of Nice, France supported the Ottomans with an artillery unit during the 1543 Ottoman conquest of Esztergom in northern Hungary. After further advances by the Turks, the Habsburg ruler Ferdinand officially recognized Ottoman ascendancy in Hungary in 1547. Suleiman I died of natural causes in his tent during the siege of Szigetvár in 1566.

In addition, the Empire became a dominant naval force, controlling much of the Mediterranean Sea. By this time, the Ottoman Empire was a major part of the European political sphere. The Ottomans became involved in multi-continental religious wars when Spain and Portugal were united under the Iberian Union. The Ottomans were holders of the Caliph title, meaning they were the leaders of all Muslims worldwide. The Iberians were leaders of the Christian crusaders, and so the two were locked in a worldwide conflict. There were zones of operations in the Mediterranean Sea and Indian Ocean, where Iberians circumnavigated Africa to reach India and, on their way, wage war upon the Ottomans and their local Muslim allies. Likewise, the Iberians passed through newly-Christianized Latin America and had sent expeditions that traversed the Pacific in order to Christianize the formerly Muslim Philippines and use it as a base to further attack the Muslims in the Far East. In this case, the Ottomans sent armies to aid its easternmost vassal and territory, the Sultanate of Aceh in Southeast Asia. 

During the 1600s, the worldwide conflict between the Ottoman Caliphate and Iberian Union was a stalemate since both powers were at similar population, technology and economic levels. Nevertheless, the success of the Ottoman political and military establishment was compared to the Roman Empire, despite the difference in the size of their respective territories, by the likes of the contemporary Italian scholar Francesco Sansovino and the French political philosopher Jean Bodin.

Stagnation and reform (1566–1827)

Revolts, reversals, and revivals (1566–1683) 

In the second half of the sixteenth century, the Ottoman Empire came under increasing strain from inflation and the rapidly rising costs of warfare that were impacting both Europe and the Middle East. These pressures led to a series of crises around the year 1600, placing great strain upon the Ottoman system of government. The empire underwent a series of transformations of its political and military institutions in response to these challenges, enabling it to successfully adapt to the new conditions of the seventeenth century and remain powerful, both militarily and economically. Historians of the mid-twentieth century once characterised this period as one of stagnation and decline, but this view is now rejected by the majority of academics.

The discovery of new maritime trade routes by Western European states allowed them to avoid the Ottoman trade monopoly. The Portuguese discovery of the Cape of Good Hope in 1488 initiated a series of Ottoman-Portuguese naval wars in the Indian Ocean throughout the 16th century. Despite the growing European presence in the Indian Ocean, Ottoman trade with the east continued to flourish. Cairo, in particular, benefitted from the rise of Yemeni coffee as a popular consumer commodity. As coffeehouses appeared in cities and towns across the empire, Cairo developed into a major center for its trade, contributing to its continued prosperity throughout the seventeenth and much of the eighteenth century.

Under Ivan IV (1533–1584), the Tsardom of Russia expanded into the Volga and Caspian regions at the expense of the Tatar khanates. In 1571, the Crimean khan Devlet I Giray, commanded by the Ottomans, burned Moscow. The next year, the invasion was repeated but repelled at the Battle of Molodi. The Ottoman Empire continued to invade Eastern Europe in a series of slave raids, and remained a significant power in Eastern Europe until the end of the 17th century.

The Ottomans decided to conquer Venetian Cyprus and on 22 July 1570, Nicosia was besieged; 50,000 Christians died, and 180,000 were enslaved. On 15 September 1570, the Ottoman cavalry appeared before the last Venetian stronghold in Cyprus, Famagusta. The Venetian defenders would hold out for 11 months against a force that would come to number 200,000 men with 145 cannons; 163,000 cannonballs struck the walls of Famagusta before it fell to the Ottomans in August 1571. The Siege of Famagusta claimed 50,000 Ottoman casualties. Meanwhile, the Holy League consisting of mostly Spanish and Venetian fleets won a victory over the Ottoman fleet at the Battle of Lepanto (1571), off southwestern Greece; Catholic forces killed over 30,000 Turks and destroyed 200 of their ships. It was a startling, if mostly symbolic, blow to the image of Ottoman invincibility, an image which the victory of the Knights of Malta over the Ottoman invaders in the 1565 siege of Malta had recently set about eroding. The battle was far more damaging to the Ottoman navy in sapping experienced manpower than the loss of ships, which were rapidly replaced. The Ottoman navy recovered quickly, persuading Venice to sign a peace treaty in 1573, allowing the Ottomans to expand and consolidate their position in North Africa.

By contrast, the Habsburg frontier had settled somewhat, a stalemate caused by a stiffening of the Habsburg defenses. The Long Turkish War against Habsburg Austria (1593–1606) created the need for greater numbers of Ottoman infantry equipped with firearms, resulting in a relaxation of recruitment policy. This contributed to problems of indiscipline and outright rebelliousness within the corps, which were never fully solved. Irregular sharpshooters (Sekban) were also recruited, and on demobilisation turned to brigandage in the Celali rebellions (1590–1610), which engendered widespread anarchy in Anatolia in the late 16th and early 17th centuries. With the Empire's population reaching 30 million people by 1600, the shortage of land placed further pressure on the government. In spite of these problems, the Ottoman state remained strong, and its army did not collapse or suffer crushing defeats. The only exceptions were campaigns against the Safavid dynasty of Persia, where many of the Ottoman eastern provinces were lost, some permanently. This 1603–1618 war eventually resulted in the Treaty of Nasuh Pasha, which ceded the entire Caucasus, except westernmost Georgia, back into the possession of Safavid Iran. The treaty ending the Cretan War cost Venice much of Dalmatia, its Aegean island possessions, and Crete. (Losses from the war totalled 30,985 Venetian soldiers and 118,754 Turkish soldiers.)

During his brief majority reign, Murad IV (1623–1640) reasserted central authority and recaptured Iraq (1639) from the Safavids. The resulting Treaty of Zuhab of that same year decisively divided the Caucasus and adjacent regions between the two neighbouring empires as it had already been defined in the 1555 Peace of Amasya.

The Sultanate of Women (1533–1656) was a period in which the mothers of young sultans exercised power on behalf of their sons. The most prominent women of this period were Kösem Sultan and her daughter-in-law Turhan Hatice, whose political rivalry culminated in Kösem's murder in 1651. During the Köprülü era (1656–1703), effective control of the Empire was exercised by a sequence of grand viziers from the Köprülü family. The Köprülü Vizierate saw renewed military success with authority restored in Transylvania, the conquest of Crete completed in 1669, and expansion into Polish southern Ukraine, with the strongholds of Khotyn, and Kamianets-Podilskyi and the territory of Podolia ceding to Ottoman control in 1676.

This period of renewed assertiveness came to a calamitous end in 1683 when Grand Vizier Kara Mustafa Pasha led a huge army to attempt a second Ottoman siege of Vienna in the Great Turkish War of 1683–1699. The final assault being fatally delayed, the Ottoman forces were swept away by allied Habsburg, German, and Polish forces spearheaded by the Polish king John III Sobieski at the Battle of Vienna. The alliance of the Holy League pressed home the advantage of the defeat at Vienna, culminating in the Treaty of Karlowitz (26 January 1699), which ended the Great Turkish War. The Ottomans surrendered control of significant territories, many permanently. Mustafa II (1695–1703) led the counterattack of 1695–1696 against the Habsburgs in Hungary, but was undone at the disastrous defeat at Zenta (in modern Serbia), 11 September 1697.

Military defeats 
Aside from the loss of the Banat and the temporary loss of Belgrade (1717–1739), the Ottoman border on the Danube and Sava remained stable during the eighteenth century. Russian expansion, however, presented a large and growing threat.  Accordingly, King Charles XII of Sweden was welcomed as an ally in the Ottoman Empire following his defeat by the Russians at the Battle of Poltava of 1709 in central Ukraine (part of the Great Northern War of 1700–1721). Charles XII persuaded the Ottoman Sultan Ahmed III to declare war on Russia, which resulted in an Ottoman victory in the Pruth River Campaign of 1710–1711, in Moldavia. 

After the Austro-Turkish War, the Treaty of Passarowitz confirmed the loss of the Banat, Serbia, and "Little Walachia" (Oltenia) to Austria. The Treaty also revealed that the Ottoman Empire was on the defensive and unlikely to present any further aggression in Europe. The Austro-Russian–Turkish War (1735–1739), which was ended by the Treaty of Belgrade in 1739, resulted in the Ottoman recovery of northern Bosnia, Habsburg Serbia (including Belgrade), Oltenia and the southern parts of the Banat of Temeswar; but the Empire lost the port of Azov, north of the Crimean Peninsula, to the Russians. After this treaty the Ottoman Empire was able to enjoy a generation of peace, as Austria and Russia were forced to deal with the rise of Prussia.

Educational and technological reforms came about, including the establishment of higher education institutions such as the Istanbul Technical University. In 1734 an artillery school was established to impart Western-style artillery methods, but the Islamic clergy successfully objected under the grounds of theodicy. In 1754 the artillery school was reopened on a semi-secret basis. In 1726, Ibrahim Muteferrika convinced the Grand Vizier Nevşehirli Damat Ibrahim Pasha, the Grand Mufti, and the clergy on the efficiency of the printing press, and Muteferrika was later granted by Sultan Ahmed III permission to publish non-religious books (despite opposition from some calligraphers and religious leaders). Muteferrika's press published its first book in 1729 and, by 1743, issued 17 works in 23 volumes, each having between 500 and 1,000 copies.

In North Africa, Spain conquered Oran from the autonomous Deylik of Algiers. The Bey of Oran received an army from Algiers, but it failed to recapture Oran; the siege caused the deaths of 1,500 Spaniards, and even more Algerians. The Spanish also massacred many Muslim soldiers. In 1792, Spain abandoned Oran, selling it to the Deylik of Algiers.

In 1768 Russian-backed Ukrainian Haidamakas, pursuing Polish confederates, entered Balta, an Ottoman-controlled town on the border of Bessarabia in Ukraine, massacred its citizens, and burned the town to the ground. This action provoked the Ottoman Empire into the Russo-Turkish War of 1768–1774. The Treaty of Küçük Kaynarca of 1774 ended the war and provided freedom of worship for the Christian citizens of the Ottoman-controlled provinces of Wallachia and Moldavia. By the late 18th century, after a number of defeats in the wars with Russia, some people in the Ottoman Empire began to conclude that the reforms of Peter the Great had given the Russians an edge, and the Ottomans would have to keep up with Western technology in order to avoid further defeats.

Selim III (1789–1807) made the first major attempts to modernise the army, but his reforms were hampered by the religious leadership and the Janissary corps. Jealous of their privileges and firmly opposed to change, the Janissary revolted. Selim's efforts cost him his throne and his life, but were resolved in spectacular and bloody fashion by his successor, the dynamic Mahmud II, who eliminated the Janissary corps in 1826.

The Serbian revolution (1804–1815) marked the beginning of an era of national awakening in the Balkans during the Eastern Question. In 1811, the fundamentalist Wahhabis of Arabia, led by the al-Saud family, revolted against the Ottomans. Unable to defeat the Wahhabi rebels, the Sublime Porte had Muhammad Ali Pasha of Kavala, the vali (governor) of the Eyalet of Egypt, tasked with retaking Arabia, which ended with the destruction of the Emirate of Diriyah in 1818. The suzerainty of Serbia as a hereditary monarchy under its own dynasty was acknowledged de jure in 1830. In 1821, the Greeks declared war on the Sultan. A rebellion that originated in Moldavia as a diversion was followed by the main revolution in the Peloponnese, which, along with the northern part of the Gulf of Corinth, became the first parts of the Ottoman Empire to achieve independence (in 1829). In 1830, the French invaded the Deylik of Algiers. The campaign that took 21 days, resulted in over 5,000 Algerian military casualties, and about 2,600 French ones. Before the French invasion the total population of Algeria was most likely between 3,000,000 and 5,000,000. By 1873, the population of Algeria (excluding several hundred thousand newly arrived French settlers) decreased to a drastic 2,172,000. In 1831, Muhammad Ali Pasha revolted against Sultan Mahmud II due to the latter's refusal to grant him the governorships of Greater Syria and Crete, which the Sultan had promised him in exchange for sending military assistance to put down the Greek revolt (1821–1829) that ultimately ended with the formal independence of Greece in 1830. It was a costly enterprise for Muhammad Ali Pasha, who had lost his fleet at the Battle of Navarino in 1827. Thus began the first Egyptian–Ottoman War (1831–1833), during which the French-trained army of Muhammad Ali Pasha, under the command of his son Ibrahim Pasha, defeated the Ottoman Army as it marched into Anatolia, reaching the city of Kütahya within  of the capital, Constantinople. In desperation, Sultan Mahmud II appealed to the empire's traditional arch-rival Russia for help, asking Emperor Nicholas I to send an expeditionary force to assist him. In return for signing the Treaty of Hünkâr İskelesi, the Russians sent the expeditionary force which deterred Ibrahim Pasha from marching any further towards Constantinople. Under the terms of the Convention of Kütahya, signed on 5 May 1833, Muhammad Ali Pasha agreed to abandon his campaign against the Sultan, in exchange for which he was made the vali (governor) of the vilayets (provinces) of Crete, Aleppo, Tripoli, Damascus and Sidon (the latter four comprising modern Syria and Lebanon), and given the right to collect taxes in Adana. Had it not been for the Russian intervention, Sultan Mahmud II could have faced the risk of being overthrown and Muhammad Ali Pasha could have even become the new Sultan. These events marked the beginning of a recurring pattern where the Sublime Porte needed the help of foreign powers to protect itself.

In 1839, the Sublime Porte attempted to take back what it lost to the de facto autonomous, but de jure still Ottoman Eyalet of Egypt, but its forces were initially defeated, which led to the Oriental Crisis of 1840. Muhammad Ali Pasha had close relations with France, and the prospect of him becoming the Sultan of Egypt was widely viewed as putting the entire Levant into the French sphere of influence. As the Sublime Porte had proved itself incapable of defeating Muhammad Ali Pasha, the British Empire and Austrian Empire provided military assistance, and the second Egyptian–Ottoman War (1839–1841) ended with Ottoman victory and the restoration of Ottoman suzerainty over Egypt Eyalet and the Levant.

By the mid-19th century, the Ottoman Empire was called the "sick man of Europe". Three suzerain states – the Principality of Serbia, Wallachia and Moldavia – moved towards de jure independence during the 1860s and 1870s.

Decline and modernisation (1828–1908) 

During the Tanzimat period (1839–1876), the government's series of constitutional reforms led to a fairly modern conscripted army, banking system reforms, the decriminalization of homosexuality, the replacement of religious law with secular law and guilds with modern factories. The Ottoman Ministry of Post was established in Istanbul in 1840. American inventor Samuel Morse received an Ottoman patent for the telegraph in 1847, which was issued by Sultan Abdülmecid who personally tested the new invention. The reformist period peaked with the Constitution, called the Kanûn-u Esâsî. The empire's First Constitutional era was short-lived. The parliament survived for only two years before the sultan suspended it.

The Christian population of the empire, owing to their higher educational levels, started to pull ahead of the Muslim majority, leading to much resentment on the part of the latter. In 1861, there were 571 primary and 94 secondary schools for Ottoman Christians with 140,000 pupils in total, a figure that vastly exceeded the number of Muslim children in school at the same time, who were further hindered by the amount of time spent learning Arabic and Islamic theology. Author Norman Stone further suggests that the Arabic alphabet, in which Turkish was written until 1928, was very ill-suited to reflect the sounds of the Turkish language (which is a Turkic as opposed to Semitic language), which imposed a further difficulty on Turkish children. In turn, the higher educational levels of the Christians allowed them to play a larger role in the economy, with the rise in prominence of groups such as the Sursock family indicative of this shift in influence. In 1911, of the 654 wholesale companies in Istanbul, 528 were owned by ethnic Greeks. In many cases, Christians and also Jews were able to gain protection from European consuls and citizenship, meaning they were protected from Ottoman law and not subject to the same economic regulations as their Muslim counterparts.

The Crimean War (1853–1856) was part of a long-running contest between the major European powers for influence over territories of the declining Ottoman Empire. The financial burden of the war led the Ottoman state to issue foreign loans amounting to 5million pounds sterling on 4 August 1854. The war caused an exodus of the Crimean Tatars, about 200,000 of whom moved to the Ottoman Empire in continuing waves of emigration. Toward the end of the Caucasian Wars, 90% of the Circassians were ethnically cleansed and exiled from their homelands in the Caucasus and fled to the Ottoman Empire, resulting in the settlement of 500,000 to 700,000 Circassians in Turkey. Some Circassian organisations give much higher numbers, totalling 1–1.5million deported or killed. Crimean Tatar refugees in the late 19th century played an especially notable role in seeking to modernise Ottoman education and in first promoting both Pan-Turkism and a sense of Turkish nationalism.

In this period, the Ottoman Empire spent only small amounts of public funds on education; for example in 1860–1861 only 0.2 percent of the total budget was invested in education. As the Ottoman state attempted to modernize its infrastructure and army in response to threats from the outside, it also opened itself up to a different kind of threat: that of creditors. Indeed, as the historian Eugene Rogan has written, "the single greatest threat to the independence of the Middle East" in the nineteenth century "was not the armies of Europe but its banks". The Ottoman state, which had begun taking on debt with the Crimean War, was forced to declare bankruptcy in 1875. By 1881, the Ottoman Empire agreed to have its debt controlled by an institution known as the Ottoman Public Debt Administration, a council of European men with presidency alternating between France and Britain. The body controlled swaths of the Ottoman economy, and used its position to ensure that European capital continued to penetrate the empire, often to the detriment of local Ottoman interests.

The Ottoman bashi-bazouks brutally suppressed the Bulgarian uprising of 1876, massacring up to 100,000 people in the process. The Russo-Turkish War (1877–1878) ended with a decisive victory for Russia. As a result, Ottoman holdings in Europe declined sharply: Bulgaria was established as an independent principality inside the Ottoman Empire; Romania achieved full independence; and Serbia and Montenegro finally gained complete independence, but with smaller territories. In 1878, Austria-Hungary unilaterally occupied the Ottoman provinces of Bosnia-Herzegovina and Novi Pazar.

British Prime Minister Benjamin Disraeli advocated for restoring the Ottoman territories on the Balkan Peninsula during the Congress of Berlin, and in return, Britain assumed the administration of Cyprus in 1878. Britain later sent troops to Egypt in 1882 to put down the Urabi Revolt – Sultan Abdul Hamid II was too paranoid to mobilize his own army, fearing this would result in a coup d'état – effectively gaining control in both territories. Abdul Hamid II, popularly known as "Abdul Hamid the Damned" on account of his cruelty and paranoia, was so fearful of the threat of a coup that he did not allow his army to conduct war games, lest this serves as the cover for a coup, but he did see the need for military mobilization. In 1883, a German military mission under General Baron Colmar von der Goltz arrived to train the Ottoman Army, leading to the so-called "Goltz generation" of German-trained officers who were to play a notable role in the politics of the last years of the empire.

From 1894 to 1896, between 100,000 and 300,000 Armenians living throughout the empire were killed in what became known as the Hamidian massacres.

In 1897 the population was 19million, of whom 14million (74%) were Muslim. An additional 20million lived in provinces that remained under the sultan's nominal suzerainty but were entirely outside his actual power. One by one the Porte lost nominal authority. They included Egypt, Tunisia, Bulgaria, Cyprus, Bosnia-Herzegovina, and Lebanon.

As the Ottoman Empire gradually shrank in size, some 7–9million Muslims from its former territories in the Caucasus, Crimea, Balkans, and the Mediterranean islands migrated to Anatolia and Eastern Thrace. After the Empire lost the First Balkan War (1912–1913), it lost all its Balkan territories except East Thrace (European Turkey). This resulted in around 400,000 Muslims fleeing with the retreating Ottoman armies (with many dying from cholera brought by the soldiers), and with some 400,000 non-Muslims fleeing territory still under Ottoman rule. Justin McCarthy estimates that during the period 1821 to 1922, 5.5million Muslims died in southeastern Europe, with the expulsion of 5million.

Defeat and dissolution (1908–1922)

Young Turk movement 

The defeat and dissolution of the Ottoman Empire (19081922) began with the Second Constitutional Era, a moment of hope and promise established with the Young Turk Revolution. It restored the Constitution of the Ottoman Empire and brought in multi-party politics with a two-stage electoral system (electoral law) under the Ottoman parliament. The constitution offered hope by freeing the empire's citizens to modernise the state's institutions, rejuvenate its strength, and enable it to hold its own against outside powers. Its guarantee of liberties promised to dissolve inter-communal tensions and transform the empire into a more harmonious place. Instead, this period became the story of the twilight struggle of the Empire.

Members of Young Turks movement who had once gone underground now established their parties. Among them "Committee of Union and Progress", and "Freedom and Accord Party" were major parties. On the other end of the spectrum were ethnic parties, which included Poale Zion, Al-Fatat, and Armenian national movement organised under Armenian Revolutionary Federation. Profiting from the civil strife, Austria-Hungary officially annexed Bosnia and Herzegovina in 1908. The last of the Ottoman censuses was performed in 1914. Despite military reforms which reconstituted the Ottoman Modern Army, the Empire lost its North African territories and the Dodecanese in the Italo-Turkish War (1911) and almost all of its European territories in the Balkan Wars (1912–1913). The Empire faced continuous unrest in the years leading up to World War I, including the 31 March Incident and two further coups in 1912 and 1913.

World War I 

The Ottoman Empire entered World War I on the side of the Central Powers and was ultimately defeated. The Ottoman participation in the war began with the combined German-Ottoman surprise attack on the Black Sea coast of the Russian Empire on 29 October 1914. Following the attack, the Russian Empire (2 November 1914) and its allies France (5 November 1914) and the British Empire (5 November 1914) declared war on the Ottoman Empire (also on 5 November 1914, the British government changed the status of the Khedivate of Egypt and Cyprus, which were de jure Ottoman territories prior to the war, as British protectorates.)

The Ottomans successfully defended the Dardanelles strait during the Gallipoli campaign (1915–1916) and achieved initial victories against British forces in the first two years of the Mesopotamian campaign, such as the Siege of Kut (1915–1916); but the Arab Revolt (1916–1918) turned the tide against the Ottomans in the Middle East. In the Caucasus campaign, however, the Russian forces had the upper hand from the beginning, especially after the Battle of Sarikamish (1914–1915). Russian forces advanced into northeastern Anatolia and controlled the major cities there until retreating from World War I with the Treaty of Brest-Litovsk following the Russian Revolution in 1917.

Genocides 

In 1915 the Ottoman government and Kurdish tribes in the region started the extermination of its ethnic Armenian population, resulting in the deaths of up to 1.5million Armenians in the Armenian genocide. The genocide was carried out during and after World War I and implemented in two phases: the wholesale killing of the able-bodied male population through massacre and subjection of army conscripts to forced labour, followed by the deportation of women, children, the elderly and infirm on death marches leading to the Syrian desert. Driven forward by military escorts, the deportees were deprived of food and water and subjected to periodic robbery, rape, and systematic massacre. Large-scale massacres were also committed against the Empire's Greek and Assyrian minorities as part of the same campaign of ethnic cleansing.

Arab Revolt 

The Arab Revolt began in 1916 with British support. It turned the tide against the Ottomans on the Middle Eastern front, where they seemed to have the upper hand during the first two years of the war. On the basis of the McMahon–Hussein Correspondence, an agreement between the British government and Hussein bin Ali, Sharif of Mecca, the revolt was officially initiated at Mecca on 10 June 1916. The Arab nationalist goal was to create a single unified and independent Arab state stretching from Aleppo in Syria to Aden in Yemen, which the British had promised to recognise.

The Sharifian Army led by Hussein and the Hashemites, with military backing from the British Egyptian Expeditionary Force, successfully fought and expelled the Ottoman military presence from much of the Hejaz and Transjordan. The rebellion eventually took Damascus and set up a short-lived monarchy led by Faisal, a son of Hussein.

Following the Sykes–Picot Agreement, the Middle East was later partitioned by the British and French into mandate territories. There was no unified Arab state, much to the anger of Arab nationalists.

Treaty of Sèvres and Turkish War of Independence 

Defeated in World War I, the Ottoman Empire signed the Armistice of Mudros on 30 October 1918. Istanbul was occupied by combined British, French, Italian, and Greek forces. In May 1919, Greece also took control of the area around Smyrna (now İzmir).

The partition of the Ottoman Empire was finalized under the terms of the 1920 Treaty of Sèvres. This treaty, as designed in the Conference of London, allowed the Sultan to retain his position and title. The status of Anatolia was problematic given the occupied forces.

There arose a nationalist opposition in the Turkish national movement. It won the Turkish War of Independence (1919–1923) under the leadership of Mustafa Kemal (later given the surname "Atatürk"). The sultanate was abolished on 1 November 1922, and the last sultan, Mehmed VI (reigned 1918–1922), left the country on 17 November 1922. The Republic of Turkey was established in its place on 29 October 1923, in the new capital city of Ankara. The caliphate was abolished on 3 March 1924.

Historiographical debate on the Ottoman state 

Several historians such as British historian Edward Gibbon and the Greek historian Dimitri Kitsikis have argued that after the fall of Constantinople, the Ottoman state took over the machinery of the Byzantine (Roman) state and that in essence, the Ottoman Empire was a continuation of the Eastern Roman Empire under a Turkish Muslim guise. The American historian Speros Vryonis wrote that the Ottoman state was centered on "a Byzantine-Balkan base with a veneer of the Turkish language and the Islamic religion". The American historian Heath Lowry and Kitsikis posit that the early Ottoman state was a predatory confederacy open to both Byzantine Christians and Turkish Muslims, whose primary goal was attaining booty and slaves, rather than spreading Islam, and that only later Islam became the primary characteristic of the empire. Other historians have followed the lead of the Austrian historian Paul Wittek who emphasized the Islamic character of the early Ottoman state, seeing the Ottoman state as a "Jihad state" dedicated to expanding the Muslim world. Many historians led in 1937 by the Turkish historian Mehmet Fuat Köprülü championed the Ghaza thesis that saw the early Ottoman state as a continuation of the way of life of the nomadic Turkic tribes who had come from East Asia to Anatolia via Central Asia and the Middle East on a much larger scale. They argued that the most important cultural influences on the Ottoman state came from Persia.

The British historian Norman Stone suggested many continuities between the Eastern Roman and Ottoman empires such as the zeugarion tax of Byzantium becoming the Ottoman Resm-i çift tax, the pronoia land-holding system that linked the amount of land one owned with one's ability to raise cavalry becoming the Ottoman timar system, and the Ottoman measurement for land the dönüm was the same as the Byzantine stremma. Stone also pointed out that despite the fact that Sunni Islam was the state religion, the Eastern Orthodox Church was supported and controlled by the Ottoman state, and in return to accepting that control became the largest land-holder in the Ottoman Empire. Despite the similarities, Stone argued that a crucial difference was that the land grants under the timar system were not hereditary at first. Even after land grants under the timar system became inheritable, land ownership in the Ottoman Empire remained highly insecure, and the sultan could and did revoke land grants whenever he wished. Stone argued this insecurity in land tenure strongly discouraged Timariots from seeking long-term development of their land, and instead led the timariots to adopt a strategy of short-term exploitation, which ultimately had deleterious effects on the Ottoman economy.

Government 

Before the reforms of the 19th and 20th centuries, the state organisation of the Ottoman Empire was a system with two main dimensions, the military administration, and the civil administration. The Sultan was in the highest position in the system. The civil system was based on local administrative units based on the region's characteristics. The state had control over the clergy. Certain pre-Islamic Turkish traditions that had survived the adoption of administrative and legal practices from Islamic Iran remained important in Ottoman administrative circles. According to Ottoman understanding, the state's primary responsibility was to defend and extend the land of the Muslims and to ensure security and harmony within its borders in the overarching context of orthodox Islamic practice and dynastic sovereignty.

The Ottoman Empire, or as a dynastic institution, the House of Osman, was unprecedented and unequaled in the Islamic world for its size and duration. In Europe, only the House of Habsburg had a similarly unbroken line of sovereigns (kings/emperors) from the same family who ruled for so long, and during the same period, between the late 13th and early 20th centuries. The Ottoman dynasty was Turkish in origin. On eleven occasions, the sultan was deposed (replaced by another sultan of the Ottoman dynasty, who were either the former sultan's brother, son or nephew) because he was perceived by his enemies as a threat to the state. There were only two attempts in Ottoman history to unseat the ruling Ottoman dynasty, both failures, which suggests a political system that for an extended period was able to manage its revolutions without unnecessary instability. As such, the last Ottoman sultan Mehmed VI was a direct patrilineal (male-line) descendant of the first Ottoman sultan Osman I ( 1323/4), which was unparalleled in both Europe (e.g., the male line of the House of Habsburg became extinct in 1740) and in the Islamic world. The primary purpose of the Imperial Harem was to ensure the birth of male heirs to the Ottoman throne and secure the continuation of the direct patrilineal (male-line) power of the Ottoman sultans in the future generations.

The highest position in Islam, caliph, was claimed by the sultans starting with Murad I, which was established as the Ottoman Caliphate. The Ottoman sultan, pâdişâh or "lord of kings", served as the Empire's sole regent and was considered to be the embodiment of its government, though he did not always exercise complete control. The Imperial Harem was one of the most important powers of the Ottoman court. It was ruled by the valide sultan. On occasion, the valide sultan would become involved in state politics. For a time, the women of the Harem effectively controlled the state in what was termed the "Sultanate of Women". New sultans were always chosen from the sons of the previous sultan. The strong educational system of the palace school was geared towards eliminating the unfit potential heirs and establishing support among the ruling elite for a successor. The palace schools, which would also educate the future administrators of the state, were not a single track. First, the Madrasa was designated for the Muslims, and educated scholars and state officials according to Islamic tradition. The financial burden of the Medrese was supported by vakifs, allowing children of poor families to move to higher social levels and income. The second track was a free boarding school for the Christians, the Enderûn, which recruited 3,000 students annually from Christian boys between eight and twenty years old from one in forty families among the communities settled in Rumelia or the Balkans, a process known as Devshirme.

Though the sultan was the supreme monarch, the sultan's political and executive authority was delegated. The politics of the state had a number of advisors and ministers gathered around a council known as Divan. The Divan, in the years when the Ottoman state was still a Beylik, was composed of the elders of the tribe. Its composition was later modified to include military officers and local elites (such as religious and political advisors). Later still, beginning in 1320, a Grand Vizier was appointed to assume certain of the sultan's responsibilities. The Grand Vizier had considerable independence from the sultan with almost unlimited powers of appointment, dismissal, and supervision. Beginning with the late 16th century, sultans withdrew from politics and the Grand Vizier became the de facto head of state.

Throughout Ottoman history, there were many instances in which local governors acted independently, and even in opposition to the ruler. After the Young Turk Revolution of 1908, the Ottoman state became a constitutional monarchy. The sultan no longer had executive powers. A parliament was formed, with representatives chosen from the provinces. The representatives formed the Imperial Government of the Ottoman Empire.

This eclectic administration was apparent even in the diplomatic correspondence of the Empire, which was initially undertaken in the Greek language to the west.

The Tughra were calligraphic monograms, or signatures, of the Ottoman Sultans, of which there were 35. Carved on the Sultan's seal, they bore the names of the Sultan and his father. The statement and prayer, "ever victorious", was also present in most. The earliest belonged to Orhan Gazi. The ornately stylized Tughra spawned a branch of Ottoman-Turkish calligraphy.

Law 

The Ottoman legal system accepted the religious law over its subjects. At the same time the Qanun (or Kanun), dynastic law, co-existed with religious law or Sharia. The Ottoman Empire was always organized around a system of local jurisprudence. Legal administration in the Ottoman Empire was part of a larger scheme of balancing central and local authority. Ottoman power revolved crucially around the administration of the rights to land, which gave a space for the local authority to develop the needs of the local millet. The jurisdictional complexity of the Ottoman Empire was aimed to permit the integration of culturally and religiously different groups. The Ottoman system had three court systems: one for Muslims, one for non-Muslims, involving appointed Jews and Christians ruling over their respective religious communities, and the "trade court". The entire system was regulated from above by means of the administrative Qanun, i.e., laws, a system based upon the Turkic Yassa and Töre, which were developed in the pre-Islamic era.

These court categories were not, however, wholly exclusive; for instance, the Islamic courts, which were the Empire's primary courts, could also be used to settle a trade conflict or disputes between litigants of differing religions, and Jews and Christians often went to them to obtain a more forceful ruling on an issue. The Ottoman state tended not to interfere with non-Muslim religious law systems, despite legally having a voice to do so through local governors. The Islamic Sharia law system had been developed from a combination of the Qur'an; the Hadīth, or words of the prophet Muhammad; ijmā', or consensus of the members of the Muslim community; qiyas, a system of analogical reasoning from earlier precedents; and local customs. Both systems were taught at the Empire's law schools, which were in Istanbul and Bursa.

The Ottoman Islamic legal system was set up differently from traditional European courts. Presiding over Islamic courts would be a Qadi, or judge. Since the closing of the ijtihad, or 'Gate of Interpretation', Qadis throughout the Ottoman Empire focused less on legal precedent, and more with local customs and traditions in the areas that they administered. However, the Ottoman court system lacked an appellate structure, leading to jurisdictional case strategies where plaintiffs could take their disputes from one court system to another until they achieved a ruling that was in their favour.

In the late 19th century, the Ottoman legal system saw substantial reform. This process of legal modernisation began with the Edict of Gülhane of 1839. These reforms included the "fair and public trial[s] of all accused regardless of religion", the creation of a system of "separate competences, religious and civil", and the validation of testimony on non-Muslims. Specific land codes (1858), civil codes (1869–1876), and a code of civil procedure also were enacted.

These reforms were based heavily on French models, as indicated by the adoption of a three-tiered court system. Referred to as Nizamiye, this system was extended to the local magistrate level with the final promulgation of the Mecelle, a civil code that regulated marriage, divorce, alimony, will, and other matters of personal status. In an attempt to clarify the division of judicial competences, an administrative council laid down that religious matters were to be handled by religious courts, and statute matters were to be handled by the Nizamiye courts.

Military 

The first military unit of the Ottoman State was an army that was organized by Osman I from the tribesmen inhabiting the hills of western Anatolia in the late 13th century. The military system became an intricate organization with the advance of the Empire. The Ottoman military was a complex system of recruiting and fief-holding. The main corps of the Ottoman Army included Janissary, Sipahi, Akıncı and Mehterân. The Ottoman army was once among the most advanced fighting forces in the world, being one of the first to use muskets and cannons. The Ottoman Turks began using falconets, which were short but wide cannons, during the Siege of Constantinople. The Ottoman cavalry depended on high speed and mobility rather than heavy armor, using bows and short swords on fast Turkoman and Arabian horses (progenitors of the Thoroughbred racing horse), and often applied tactics similar to those of the Mongol Empire, such as pretending to retreat while surrounding the enemy forces inside a crescent-shaped formation and then making the real attack. The Ottoman army continued to be an effective fighting force throughout the seventeenth and early eighteenth centuries, falling behind the empire's European rivals only during a long period of peace from 1740 to 1768.

The modernization of the Ottoman Empire in the 19th century started with the military. In 1826 Sultan Mahmud II abolished the Janissary corps and established the modern Ottoman army. He named them as the Nizam-ı Cedid (New Order). The Ottoman army was also the first institution to hire foreign experts and send its officers for training in western European countries. Consequently, the Young Turks movement began when these relatively young and newly trained men returned with their education.

The Ottoman Navy vastly contributed to the expansion of the Empire's territories on the European continent. It initiated the conquest of North Africa, with the addition of Algeria and Egypt to the Ottoman Empire in 1517. Starting with the loss of Greece in 1821 and Algeria in 1830, Ottoman naval power and control over the Empire's distant overseas territories began to decline. Sultan Abdülaziz (reigned 1861–1876) attempted to reestablish a strong Ottoman navy, building the largest fleet after those of Britain and France. The shipyard at Barrow, England, built its first submarine in 1886 for the Ottoman Empire.

However, the collapsing Ottoman economy could not sustain the fleet's strength for long. Sultan Abdülhamid II distrusted the admirals who sided with the reformist Midhat Pasha and claimed that the large and expensive fleet was of no use against the Russians during the Russo-Turkish War. He locked most of the fleet inside the Golden Horn, where the ships decayed for the next 30 years. Following the Young Turk Revolution in 1908, the Committee of Union and Progress sought to develop a strong Ottoman naval force. The Ottoman Navy Foundation was established in 1910 to buy new ships through public donations.

The establishment of Ottoman military aviation dates back to between June 1909 and July 1911. The Ottoman Empire started preparing its first pilots and planes, and with the founding of the Aviation School (Tayyare Mektebi) in Yeşilköy on 3 July 1912, the Empire began to tutor its own flight officers. The founding of the Aviation School quickened advancement in the military aviation program, increased the number of enlisted persons within it, and gave the new pilots an active role in the Ottoman Army and Navy. In May 1913, the world's first specialized Reconnaissance Training Program was started by the Aviation School, and the first separate reconnaissance division was established. In June 1914 a new military academy, the Naval Aviation School (Bahriye Tayyare Mektebi) was founded. With the outbreak of World War I, the modernization process stopped abruptly. The Ottoman Aviation Squadrons fought on many fronts during World War I, from Galicia in the west to the Caucasus in the east and Yemen in the south.

Administrative divisions 

The Ottoman Empire was first subdivided into provinces, in the sense of fixed territorial units with governors appointed by the sultan, in the late 14th century.

The Eyalet (also Pashalik or Beylerbeylik) was the territory of office of a Beylerbey ("lord of lords" or governor), and was further subdivided in Sanjaks.
The Vilayets were introduced with the promulgation of the "Vilayet Law" in 1864, as part of the Tanzimat reforms. Unlike the previous eyalet system, the 1864 law established a hierarchy of administrative units: the vilayet, liva/sanjak/mutasarrifate, kaza and village council, to which the 1871 Vilayet Law added the nahiye.

Economy 

Ottoman government deliberately pursued a policy for the development of Bursa, Edirne, and Istanbul, successive Ottoman capitals, into major commercial and industrial centers, considering that merchants and artisans were indispensable in creating a new metropolis. To this end, Mehmed and his successor Bayezid, also encouraged and welcomed migration of the Jews from different parts of Europe, who were settled in Istanbul and other port cities like Salonica. In many places in Europe, Jews were suffering persecution at the hands of their Christian counterparts, such as in Spain, after the conclusion of Reconquista. The tolerance displayed by the Turks was welcomed by the immigrants.

The Ottoman economic mind was closely related to the basic concepts of state and society in the Middle East in which the ultimate goal of a state was consolidation and extension of the ruler's power, and the way to reach it was to get rich resources of revenues by making the productive classes prosperous. The ultimate aim was to increase the state revenues without damaging the prosperity of subjects to prevent the emergence of social disorder and to keep the traditional organization of the society intact. The Ottoman economy greatly expanded during the early modern period, with particularly high growth rates during the first half of the eighteenth century. The empire's annual income quadrupled between 1523 and 1748, adjusted for inflation.

The organization of the treasury and chancery were developed under the Ottoman Empire more than any other Islamic government and, until the 17th century, they were the leading organization among all their contemporaries. This organisation developed a scribal bureaucracy (known as "men of the pen") as a distinct group, partly highly trained ulama, which developed into a professional body. The effectiveness of this professional financial body stands behind the success of many great Ottoman statesmen.

Modern Ottoman studies indicate that the change in relations between the Ottoman Turks and central Europe was caused by the opening of the new sea routes. It is possible to see the decline in the significance of the land routes to the East as Western Europe opened the ocean routes that bypassed the Middle East and the Mediterranean as parallel to the decline of the Ottoman Empire itself. The Anglo-Ottoman Treaty, also known as the Treaty of Balta Liman that opened the Ottoman markets directly to English and French competitors, would be seen as one of the staging posts along with this development.

By developing commercial centers and routes, encouraging people to extend the area of cultivated land in the country and international trade through its dominions, the state performed basic economic functions in the Empire. But in all this, the financial and political interests of the state were dominant. Within the social and political system they were living in, Ottoman administrators could not see the desirability of the dynamics and principles of the capitalist and mercantile economies developing in Western Europe.

Economic historian Paul Bairoch argues that free trade contributed to deindustrialisation in the Ottoman Empire. In contrast to the protectionism of China, Japan, and Spain, the Ottoman Empire had a liberal trade policy, open to foreign imports. This has origins in capitulations of the Ottoman Empire, dating back to the first commercial treaties signed with France in 1536 and taken further with capitulations in 1673 and 1740, which lowered duties to 3% for imports and exports. The liberal Ottoman policies were praised by British economists, such as John Ramsay McCulloch in his Dictionary of Commerce (1834), but later criticized by British politicians such as Prime Minister Benjamin Disraeli, who cited the Ottoman Empire as "an instance of the injury done by unrestrained competition" in the 1846 Corn Laws debate.

Demographics 

A population estimate for the empire of 11,692,480 for the 1520–1535 period was obtained by counting the households in Ottoman tithe registers, and multiplying this number by 5. For unclear reasons, the population in the 18th century was lower than that in the 16th century. An estimate of 7,230,660 for the first census held in 1831 is considered a serious undercount, as this census was meant only to register possible conscripts.

Censuses of Ottoman territories only began in the early 19th century. Figures from 1831 onwards are available as official census results, but the censuses did not cover the whole population. For example, the 1831 census only counted men and did not cover the whole empire. For earlier periods estimates of size and distribution of the population are based on observed demographic patterns.

However, it began to rise to reach 25–32 million by 1800, with around 10 million in the European provinces (primarily in the Balkans), 11 million in the Asiatic provinces, and around 3 million in the African provinces. Population densities were higher in the European provinces, double those in Anatolia, which in turn were triple the population densities of Iraq and Syria and five times the population density of Arabia.

Towards the end of the empire's existence life expectancy was 49 years, compared to the mid-twenties in Serbia at the beginning of the 19th century. Epidemic diseases and famine caused major disruption and demographic changes. In 1785 around one-sixth of the Egyptian population died from the plague and Aleppo saw its population reduced by twenty percent in the 18th century. Six famines hit Egypt alone between 1687 and 1731 and the last famine to hit Anatolia was four decades later.

The rise of port cities saw the clustering of populations caused by the development of steamships and railroads. Urbanization increased from 1700 to 1922, with towns and cities growing. Improvements in health and sanitation made them more attractive to live and work in. Port cities like Salonica, in Greece, saw its population rise from 55,000 in 1800 to 160,000 in 1912 and İzmir which had a population of 150,000 in 1800 grew to 300,000 by 1914. Some regions conversely had population falls—Belgrade saw its population drop from 25,000 to 8,000 mainly due to political strife.

Economic and political migrations made an impact across the empire. For example, the Russian and Austria-Habsburg annexation of the Crimean and Balkan regions respectively saw large influxes of Muslim refugees—200,000 Crimean Tartars fleeing to Dobruja. Between 1783 and 1913, approximately 5–7 million refugees flooded into the Ottoman Empire, at least 3.8 million of whom were from Russia. Some migrations left indelible marks such as political tension between parts of the empire (e.g., Turkey and Bulgaria), whereas centrifugal effects were noticed in other territories, simpler demographics emerging from diverse populations. Economies were also impacted by the loss of artisans, merchants, manufacturers, and agriculturists. Since the 19th century, a large proportion of Muslim peoples from the Balkans emigrated to present-day Turkey. These people are called Muhacir. By the time the Ottoman Empire came to an end in 1922, half of the urban population of Turkey was descended from Muslim refugees from Russia.

Language 

Ottoman Turkish was the official language of the Empire. It was an Oghuz Turkic language highly influenced by Persian and Arabic, though lower registries spoken by the common people had fewer influences from other languages compared to higher varieties used by upper classes and governmental authorities. Turkish, in its Ottoman variation, was a language of military and administration since the nascent days of the Ottomans. The Ottoman constitution of 1876 did officially cement the official imperial status of Turkish.

The Ottomans had several influential languages: Turkish, spoken by the majority of the people in Anatolia and by the majority of Muslims of the Balkans except in Albania, Bosnia and the Megleno-Romanian-inhabited Nânti; Persian, only spoken by the educated; Arabic, spoken mainly in Egypt, the Levant, Arabia, Iraq, North Africa, Kuwait and parts of the Horn of Africa and Berber in North Africa. In the last two centuries, usage of these became limited, though, and specific: Persian served mainly as a literary language for the educated, while Arabic was used for Islamic prayers. In the post-Tanzimat period French became the common Western language among the educated.

Because of a low literacy rate among the public (about 2–3% until the early 19th century and just about 15% at the end of the 19th century), ordinary people had to hire scribes as "special request-writers" (arzuhâlcis) to be able to communicate with the government. Some ethnic groups continued to speak within their families and neighborhoods (mahalles) with their own languages, though many non-Muslim minorities such as Greeks and Armenians only spoke Turkish. In villages where two or more populations lived together, the inhabitants would often speak each other's language. In cosmopolitan cities, people often spoke their family languages; many of those who were not ethnic Turks spoke Turkish as a second language.

Religion 

Sunni Islam was the prevailing Dīn (customs, legal traditions, and religion) of the Ottoman Empire; the official Madh'hab (school of Islamic jurisprudence) was Hanafi. From the early 16th century until the early 20th century, the Ottoman sultan also served as the caliph, or politico-religious leader, of the Muslim world. Most of the Ottoman Sultans adhered to Sufism and followed Sufi orders, and believed Sufism was the correct way to reach God.

Non-Muslims, particularly Christians and Jews, were present throughout the empire's history. The Ottoman imperial system was charactised by an intricate combination of official Muslim hegemony over non-Muslims and a wide degree of religious tolerance. While religious minorities were never equal under the law, they were granted recognition, protection, and limited freedoms under both Islamic and Ottoman tradition.

Until the second half of the 15th century, the majority of Ottoman subjects were Christian. Non-Muslims remained a significant and economically influential minority, albeit declining significantly by the 19th century, due largely to migration and secession. The proportion of Muslims amounted to 60% in the 1820s, gradually increasing to 69% in the 1870s and 76% in the 1890s. By 1914, less than a fifth of the empire's population (19.1%) was non-Muslim, mostly made up of Jews and Christian Greeks, Assyrians, and Armenians.

Islam 

Turkic peoples practiced a form of shamanism before adopting Islam. The Muslim conquest of Transoxiana under the Abbasids facilitated the spread of Islam into the Turkic heartland of Central Asia. Many Turkic tribes—including the Oghuz Turks, who were the ancestors of both the Seljuks and the Ottomans—gradually converted to Islam and brought religion to Anatolia through their migrations beginning in the 11th century. From its founding, the Ottoman Empire officially supported the Maturidi school of Islamic theology, which emphasized human reason, rationality, the pursuit of science and philosophy (falsafa). The Ottomans were among the earliest and most enthusiastic adopters of the Hanafi school of Islamic jurisprudence, which was comparatively more flexible and discretionary in its rulings.

The Ottoman Empire had a wide variety of Islamic sects, including Druze, Ismailis, Alevis, and Alawites. Sufism, a diverse body of Islamic mysticism, found fertile ground in Ottoman lands; many Sufi religious orders (tariqa), such as the Bektashi and Mevlevi, were either established, or saw significant growth, throughout the empire's history. However, some heterodox Muslim groups were viewed as heretical and even ranked below Jews and Christians in terms of legal protection; Druze were frequent targets of persecution, with Ottoman authorities often citing the controversial rulings of Ibn Taymiyya, a member of the conservative Hanbali school. In 1514, Sultan Selim I ordered the massacre of 40,000 Anatolian Alevis (Qizilbash), whom he considered a fifth column for the rival Safavid Empire.

During Selim's reign, the Ottoman Empire saw an unprecedented and rapid expansion into the Middle East, particularly the conquest of the entire Mamluk Sultanate of Egypt on the early 16th century. These conquests further solidified the Ottoman claim of being an Islamic caliphate, although Ottoman sultans had been claiming the title of caliph since the reign of Murad I (1362–1389). The caliphate was officially transferred from the Mamluks to the Ottoman sultanate in 1517, whose members would be recognized as caliphs until the office's abolition on 3 March 1924 by the Republic of Turkey (and the exile of the last caliph, Abdülmecid II, to France).

Christianity and Judaism 

In accordance with the Muslim dhimmi system, the Ottoman Empire guaranteed limited freedoms to Christians, Jews, and other "people of the book", such as the right to worship, own property, and be exempt from the obligatory alms (zakat) required of Muslims. However, non-Muslims (or ) were subject to various legal restrictions, including being forbidden to carry weapons, ride on horseback, or have their homes overlook those of Muslims; likewise, they were required to pay higher taxes than Muslim subjects, including the jizya, which was a key source of state revenue. Many Christians and Jews converted to Islam to secure full social and legal status, though most continued to practice their faith without restriction.

The Ottomans developed a unique sociopolitical system known as the millet, which granted non-Muslim communities a large degree of political, legal, and religious autonomy; in essence, members of a millet were subjects of the empire but not subject to the Muslim faith or Islamic law. A millet could govern its own affairs, such as raising taxes and resolving internal legal disputes, with little or no interference from Ottoman authorities, so long as its members were loyal to the sultan and adhered to the rules concerning dhimmi. A quintessential example is the ancient Orthodox community of Mount Athos, which was permitted to retain its autonomy and was never subject to occupation or forced conversion; even special laws were enacted to protect it from outsiders.

The Rum Millet, which encompassed most Eastern Orthodox Christians, was governed by the Byzantine-era Corpus Juris Civilis (Code of Justinian), with the Ecumenical Patriarch designated the highest religious and political authority (millet-bashi, or ethnarch). Likewise, Ottoman Jews came under the authority of the Haham Başı, or Ottoman Chief Rabbi, while Armenians were under the authority of the chief bishop of the Armenian Apostolic Church. As the largest group of non-Muslim subjects, the Rum Millet enjoyed several special privileges in politics and commerce; however, Jews and Armenians were also well represented among the wealthy merchant class, as well as in public administration.

Some modern scholars consider the millet system to be an early example of religious pluralism, as it accorded minority religious groups official recognition and tolerance.

Social-political-religious structure 

Beginning in the early 19th century, society, government, and religion were interrelated in a complex, overlapping way that was deemed inefficient by Atatürk, who systematically dismantled it after 1922. In Constantinople, the Sultan ruled two distinct domains: the secular government and the religious hierarchy. Religious officials formed the Ulama, who had control of religious teachings and theology, and also the Empire's judicial system, giving them a major voice in day-to-day affairs in communities across the Empire (but not including the non-Muslim millets). They were powerful enough to reject the military reforms proposed by Sultan Selim III. His successor Sultan Mahmud II (r. 1808–1839) first won ulama approval before proposing similar reforms. The secularisation program brought by Atatürk ended the ulema and their institutions. The caliphate was abolished, madrasas were closed down, and the sharia courts were abolished. He replaced the Arabic alphabet with Latin letters, ended the religious school system, and gave women some political rights. Many rural traditionalists never accepted this secularisation, and by the 1990s they were reasserting a demand for a larger role for Islam.

The Janissaries were a highly formidable military unit in the early years, but as Western Europe modernized its military organization technology, the Janissaries became a reactionary force that resisted all change. Steadily the Ottoman military power became outdated, but when the Janissaries felt their privileges were being threatened, or outsiders wanted to modernize them, or they might be superseded by the cavalrymen, they rose in rebellion. The rebellions were highly violent on both sides, but by the time the Janissaries were suppressed, it was far too late for Ottoman military power to catch up with the West. The political system was transformed by the destruction of the Janissaries, a very powerful military/governmental/police force, which revolted during in the Auspicious Incident of 1826. Sultan Mahmud II crushed the revolt executed the leaders and disbanded the large organization. That set the stage for a slow process of modernization of government functions, as the government sought, with mixed success, to adopt the main elements of Western bureaucracy and military technology.

The Janissaries had been recruited from Christians and other minorities; their abolition enabled the emergence of a Turkish elite to control the Ottoman Empire. The problem was that the Turkish element was very poorly educated, lacking higher schools of any sort, and locked into the Turkish language that used the Arabic alphabet that inhibited wider learning. A large number of ethnic and religious minorities were tolerated in their own separate segregated domains called millets. They were primarily Greek, Armenian, or Jewish. In each locality, they governed themselves, spoke their own language, ran their own schools, cultural and religious institutions, and paid somewhat higher taxes. They had no power outside the millet. The Imperial government protected them and prevented major violent clashes between ethnic groups. However, the millets showed very little loyalty to the Empire. Ethnic nationalism, based on distinctive religion and language, provided a centripetal force that eventually destroyed the Ottoman Empire. In addition, Muslim ethnic groups, which were not part of the millet system, especially the Arabs and the Kurds, were outside the Turkish culture and developed their own separate nationalism. The British sponsored Arab nationalism in the First World War, promising an independent Arab state in return for Arab support. Most Arabs supported the Sultan, but those near Mecca believed in and supported the British promise.

At the local level, power was held beyond the control of the Sultan by the ayans or local notables. The ayan collected taxes, formed local armies to compete with other notables, took a reactionary attitude toward political or economic change, and often defied policies handed down by the Sultan.

The economic system made little progress. Printing was forbidden until the 18th century, for fear of defiling the secret documents of Islam. The millets, however, were allowed their own presses, using Greek, Hebrew, Armenian and other languages that greatly facilitated nationalism. The religious prohibition on charging interest foreclosed most of the entrepreneurial skills among Muslims, although it did flourish among the Jews and Christians.

After the 18th century, the Ottoman Empire was clearly shrinking, as Russia put on heavy pressure and expanded to its south; Egypt became effectively independent in 1805, and the British later took it over, along with Cyprus. Greece became independent, and Serbia and other Balkan areas became highly restive as the force of nationalism pushed against imperialism. The French took over Algeria and Tunisia. The Europeans all thought that the empire was a sick man in rapid decline. Only the Germans seemed helpful, and their support led to the Ottoman Empire joining the central powers in 1915, with the result that they came out as one of the heaviest losers of the First World War in 1918.

Culture 

The Ottomans absorbed some of the traditions, art, and institutions of cultures in the regions they conquered and added new dimensions to them. Numerous traditions and cultural traits of previous empires (In fields such as architecture, cuisine, music, leisure, and government) were adopted by the Ottoman Turks, who developed them into new forms, resulting in a new and distinctively Ottoman cultural identity. Although the predominant literary language of the Ottoman Empire was Turkish, Persian was the preferred vehicle for the projection of an imperial image.

Slavery was a part of Ottoman society, with most slaves employed as domestic servants. Agricultural slavery, such as that which was widespread in the Americas, was relatively rare. Unlike systems of chattel slavery, slaves under Islamic law were not regarded as movable property, and the children of female slaves were born legally free. Female slaves were still sold in the Empire as late as 1908. During the 19th century the Empire came under pressure from Western European countries to outlaw the practice. Policies developed by various sultans throughout the 19th century attempted to curtail the Ottoman slave trade but slavery had centuries of religious backing and sanction and so slavery was never abolished in the Empire.

Plague remained a major scourge in Ottoman society until the second quarter of the 19th century. "Between 1701 and 1750, 37 larger and smaller plague epidemics were recorded in Istanbul, and 31 between 1751 and 1801."

Ottomans adopted Persian bureaucratic traditions and culture. The sultans also made an important contribution in the development of Persian literature.

Education 

In the Ottoman Empire, each millet established a schooling system serving its members. Education, therefore, was largely divided on ethnic and religious lines: few non-Muslims attended schools for Muslim students and vice versa. Most institutions that did serve all ethnic and religious groups taught in French or other languages. 

Several "foreign schools" (Frerler mektebleri) operated by religious clergy primarily served Christians, although some Muslim students attended. Garnett described the schools for Christians and Jews as "organised upon European models", with "voluntary contributions" supporting their operation and most of them being "well attended" and with "a high standard of education".

Literature 

The two primary streams of Ottoman written literature are poetry and prose. Poetry was by far the dominant stream. Until the 19th century, Ottoman prose did not contain any examples of fiction: there were no counterparts to, for instance, the European romance, short story, or novel. Analog genres did exist, though, in both Turkish folk literature and in Divan poetry.

Ottoman Divan poetry was a highly ritualized and symbolic art form. From the Persian poetry that largely inspired it, it inherited a wealth of symbols whose meanings and interrelationships—both of similitude (  /  ) and opposition were more or less prescribed. Divan poetry was composed through the constant juxtaposition of many such images within a strict metrical framework, thus allowing numerous potential meanings to emerge. The vast majority of Divan poetry was lyric in nature: either gazels (which make up the greatest part of the repertoire of the tradition), or kasîdes. There were, however, other common genres, most particularly the mesnevî, a kind of verse romance and thus a variety of narrative poetry; the two most notable examples of this form are the Leyli and Majnun of Fuzûlî and the Hüsn ü Aşk of Şeyh Gâlib. The Seyahatnâme of Evliya Çelebi (1611–1682) is an outstanding example of travel literature.

Until the 19th century, Ottoman prose did not develop to the extent that contemporary Divan poetry did. Nevertheless, there was a tradition of prose in the literature of the time, though exclusively non-fictional in nature. One apparent exception was Muhayyelât ("Fancies") by Giritli Ali Aziz Efendi, a collection of stories of the fantastic written in 1796, though not published until 1867. The first novel published in the Ottoman Empire was by an Armenian named Vartan Pasha. Published in 1851, the novel was entitled The Story of Akabi (Turkish: Akabi Hikyayesi) and was written in Turkish but with Armenian script.

Due to historically close ties with France, French literature came to constitute the major Western influence on Ottoman literature throughout the latter half of the 19th century. As a result, many of the same movements prevalent in France during this period also had their Ottoman equivalents; in the developing Ottoman prose tradition, for instance, the influence of Romanticism can be seen during the Tanzimat period, and that of the Realist and Naturalist movements in subsequent periods; in the poetic tradition, on the other hand, it was the influence of the Symbolist and Parnassian movements that became paramount.

Many of the writers in the Tanzimat period wrote in several different genres simultaneously; for instance, the poet Namık Kemal also wrote the important 1876 novel İntibâh ("Awakening"), while the journalist İbrahim Şinasi is noted for writing, in 1860, the first modern Turkish play, the one-act comedy "" ("The Poet's Marriage"). An earlier play, a farce entitled "" ("The Strange Events and Bizarre Occurrences of the Cobbler Ahmed"), dates from the beginning of the 19th century, but there remains some doubt about its authenticity. In a similar vein, the novelist Ahmed Midhat Efendi wrote important novels in each of the major movements: Romanticism (Hasan Mellâh yâhud Sırr İçinde Esrâr, 1873; "Hasan the Sailor, or The Mystery Within the Mystery"), Realism (1881; "Just Seventeen Years Old"), and Naturalism (1891; "Observations"). This diversity was, in part, due to the Tanzimat writers' wish to disseminate as much of the new literature as possible, in the hopes that it would contribute to a revitalization of Ottoman social structures.

Media 

The media of the Ottoman Empire was diverse, with newspapers and journals published in various languages including French, Greek, and German. Many of these publications were centered in Constantinople, but there were also French-language newspapers produced in Beirut, Salonika, and Smyrna. Non-Muslim ethnic minorities in the empire used French as a lingua franca and used French-language publications, while some provincial newspapers were published in Arabic. The use of French in the media persisted until the end of the empire in 1923 and for a few years thereafter in the Republic of Turkey.

Architecture 

The architecture of the empire developed from earlier Seljuk Turkish architecture, with influences from Byzantine and Iranian architecture and other architectural traditions in the Middle East. Early Ottoman architecture experimented with multiple building types over the course of the 13th to 15th centuries, progressively evolving into the Classical Ottoman style of the 16th and 17th centuries, which was also strongly influenced by the Hagia Sophia. The most important architect of the Classical period is Mimar Sinan, whose major works include the Şehzade Mosque, Süleymaniye Mosque, and Selimiye Mosque. The greatest of the court artists enriched the Ottoman Empire with many pluralistic artistic influences, such as mixing traditional Byzantine art with elements of Chinese art. The second half of the 16th century also saw the apogee of certain decorative arts, most notably in the use of Iznik tiles.

Beginning in the 18th century, Ottoman architecture was influenced by the Baroque architecture in Western Europe, resulting in the Ottoman Baroque style. Nuruosmaniye Mosque is one of the most important examples from this period. The last Ottoman period saw more influences from Western Europe, brought in by architects such as those from the Balyan family. Empire style and Neoclassical motifs were introduced and a trend towards eclecticism was evident in many types of buildings, such as the Dolmabaçe Palace. The last decades of the Ottoman Empire also saw the development of a new architectural style called neo-Ottoman or Ottoman revivalism, also known as the First National Architectural Movement, by architects such as Mimar Kemaleddin and Vedat Tek.

Ottoman dynastic patronage was concentrated in the historic capitals of Bursa, Edirne, and Istanbul (Constantinople), as well as in several other important administrative centers such as Amasya and Manisa. It was in these centers that most important developments in Ottoman architecture occurred and that the most monumental Ottoman architecture can be found. Major religious monuments were typically architectural complexes, known as a külliye, that had multiple components providing different services or amenities. In addition to a mosque, these could include a madrasa, a hammam, an imaret, a sebil, a market, a caravanserai, a primary school, or others. These complexes were governed and managed with the help of a vakif agreement (Arabic waqf). Ottoman constructions were still abundant in Anatolia and in the Balkans (Rumelia), but in the more distant Middle Eastern and North African provinces older Islamic architectural styles continued to hold strong influence and were sometimes blended with Ottoman styles.

Decorative arts 

The tradition of Ottoman miniatures, painted to illustrate manuscripts or used in dedicated albums, was heavily influenced by the Persian art form, though it also included elements of the Byzantine tradition of illumination and painting. A Greek academy of painters, the Nakkashane-i-Rum, was established in the Topkapi Palace in the 15th century, while early in the following century a similar Persian academy, the Nakkashane-i-Irani, was added. Surname-i Hümayun (Imperial Festival Books) were albums that commemorated celebrations in the Ottoman Empire in pictorial and textual detail.

Ottoman illumination covers non-figurative painted or drawn decorative art in books or on sheets in muraqqa or albums, as opposed to the figurative images of the Ottoman miniature. It was a part of the Ottoman Book Arts together with the Ottoman miniature (taswir), calligraphy (hat), Islamic calligraphy, bookbinding (cilt) and paper marbling (ebru). In the Ottoman Empire, illuminated and illustrated manuscripts were commissioned by the Sultan or the administrators of the court. In Topkapi Palace, these manuscripts were created by the artists working in Nakkashane, the atelier of the miniature and illumination artists. Both religious and non-religious books could be illuminated. Also, sheets for albums levha consisted of illuminated calligraphy (hat) of tughra, religious texts, verses from poems or proverbs, and purely decorative drawings.

The art of carpet weaving was particularly significant in the Ottoman Empire, carpets having an immense importance both as decorative furnishings, rich in religious and other symbolism and as a practical consideration, as it was customary to remove one's shoes in living quarters. The weaving of such carpets originated in the nomadic cultures of central Asia (carpets being an easily transportable form of furnishing), and eventually spread to the settled societies of Anatolia. Turks used carpets, rugs, and kilims not just on the floors of a room but also as a hanging on walls and doorways, where they provided additional insulation. They were also commonly donated to mosques, which often amassed large collections of them.

Music and performing arts 

Ottoman classical music was an important part of the education of the Ottoman elite. A number of the Ottoman sultans have accomplished musicians and composers themselves, such as Selim III, whose compositions are often still performed today. Ottoman classical music arose largely from a confluence of Byzantine music, Armenian music, Arabic music, and Persian music. Compositionally, it is organized around rhythmic units called usul, which are somewhat similar to meter in Western music, and melodic units called makam, which bear some resemblance to Western musical modes.

The instruments used are a mixture of Anatolian and Central Asian instruments (the saz, the bağlama, the kemence), other Middle Eastern instruments (the ud, the tanbur, the kanun, the ney), and—later in the tradition—Western instruments (the violin and the piano). Because of a geographic and cultural divide between the capital and other areas, two broadly distinct styles of music arose in the Ottoman Empire: Ottoman classical music and folk music. In the provinces, several different kinds of folk music were created. The most dominant regions with their distinguished musical styles are Balkan-Thracian Türküs, North-Eastern (Laz) Türküs, Aegean Türküs, Central Anatolian Türküs, Eastern Anatolian Türküs, and Caucasian Türküs. Some of the distinctive styles were: Janissary music, Roma music, Belly dance, Turkish folk music.

The traditional shadow play called Karagöz and Hacivat was widespread throughout the Ottoman Empire and featured characters representing all of the major ethnic and social groups in that culture. It was performed by a single puppet master, who voiced all of the characters, and accompanied by tambourine (def). Its origins are obscure, deriving perhaps from an older Egyptian tradition, or possibly from an Asian source.

Cuisine 

Ottoman cuisine is the cuisine of the capital, Constantinople (Istanbul), and the regional capital cities, where the melting pot of cultures created a common cuisine that most of the population regardless of ethnicity shared. This diverse cuisine was honed in the Imperial Palace's kitchens by chefs brought from certain parts of the Empire to create and experiment with different ingredients. The creations of the Ottoman Palace's kitchens filtered to the population, for instance through Ramadan events, and through the cooking at the Yalıs of the Pashas, and from there on spread to the rest of the population.

Much of the cuisine of former Ottoman territories today is descended from a shared Ottoman cuisine, especially Turkish, and including Greek, Balkan, Armenian, and Middle Eastern cuisines. Many common dishes in the region, descendants of the once-common Ottoman cuisine, include yogurt, döner kebab/gyro/shawarma, cacık/tzatziki, ayran, pita bread, feta cheese, baklava, lahmacun, moussaka, yuvarlak, köfte/keftés/kofta, börek/boureki, rakı/rakia/tsipouro/tsikoudia, meze, dolma, sarma, rice pilaf, Turkish coffee, sujuk, kashk, keşkek, manti, lavash, kanafeh, and more.

Sports 

The main sports Ottomans were engaged in were Turkish wrestling, hunting, Turkish archery, horseback riding, equestrian javelin throw, arm wrestling, and swimming. European model sports clubs were formed with the spreading popularity of football matches in 19th century Constantinople. The leading clubs, according to timeline, were Beşiktaş Gymnastics Club (1903), Galatasaray Sports Club (1905), Fenerbahçe Sports Club (1907), MKE Ankaragücü (formerly Turan Sanatkaragücü) (1910) in Constantinople. Football clubs were formed in other provinces too, such as Karşıyaka Sports Club (1912), Altay Sports Club (1914) and Turkish Fatherland Football Club (later Ülküspor) (1914) of İzmir.

Science and technology 

Over the course of Ottoman history, the Ottomans managed to build a large collection of libraries complete with translations of books from other cultures, as well as original manuscripts. A great part of this desire for local and foreign manuscripts arose in the 15th century. Sultan Mehmet II ordered Georgios Amiroutzes, a Greek scholar from Trabzon, to translate and make available to Ottoman educational institutions the geography book of Ptolemy. Another example is Ali Qushji – an astronomer, mathematician and physicist originally from Samarkand – who became a professor in two madrasas and influenced Ottoman circles as a result of his writings and the activities of his students, even though he only spent two or three years in Constantinople before his death.

Taqi al-Din built the Constantinople observatory of Taqi al-Din in 1577, where he carried out observations until 1580. He calculated the eccentricity of the Sun's orbit and the annual motion of the apogee. However, the observatory's primary purpose was almost certainly astrological rather than astronomical, leading to its destruction in 1580 due to the rise of a clerical faction that opposed its use for that purpose. He also experimented with steam power in Ottoman Egypt in 1551, when he described a steam jack driven by a rudimentary steam turbine.

In 1660 the Ottoman scholar Ibrahim Efendi al-Zigetvari Tezkireci translated Noël Duret's French astronomical work (written in 1637) into Arabic.

Şerafeddin Sabuncuoğlu was the author of the first surgical atlas and the last major medical encyclopaedia from the Islamic world. Though his work was largely based on Abu al-Qasim al-Zahrawi's Al-Tasrif, Sabuncuoğlu introduced many innovations of his own. Female surgeons were also illustrated for the first time. Since, the Ottoman Empire is credited with the invention of several surgical instruments in use such as forceps, catheters, scalpels and lancets as well as pincers.

An example of a watch that measured time in minutes was created by an Ottoman watchmaker, Meshur Sheyh Dede, in 1702.

In the early 19th century, Egypt under Muhammad Ali began using steam engines for industrial manufacturing, with industries such as ironworks, textile manufacturing, paper mills and hulling mills moving towards steam power. Economic historian Jean Batou argues that the necessary economic conditions existed in Egypt for the adoption of oil as a potential energy source for its steam engines later in the 19th century.

In the 19th century, Ishak Efendi is credited with introducing the then current Western scientific ideas and developments to the Ottoman and wider Muslim world, as well as the invention of a suitable Turkish and Arabic scientific terminology, through his translations of Western works.

See also 

 Turkic History
 Outline of the Ottoman Empire
 Bibliography of the Ottoman Empire
 Gunpowder empires
 Historiography of the fall of the Ottoman Empire
 Index of Ottoman Empire-related articles
 List of battles involving the Ottoman Empire
 List of Ottoman conquests, sieges and landings
 List of Turkic dynasties and countries
 List of wars involving the Ottoman Empire
 Ottoman wars in Europe
 The Inspection Board of Finance of Turkey (1879)
 16 Great Turkic Empires

References

Footnotes

Citations

Sources 

 
 
 
 
  popular history espouses old "decline" thesis

Further reading

General surveys 

 The Cambridge History of Turkey online 
 Volume 1: Kate Fleet ed., "Byzantium to Turkey 1071–1453." Cambridge University Press, 2009.
 Volume 2: Suraiya N. Faroqhi and Kate Fleet eds., "The Ottoman Empire as a World Power, 1453–1603." Cambridge University Press, 2012.
 Volume 3: Suraiya N. Faroqhi ed., "The Later Ottoman Empire, 1603–1839." Cambridge University Press, 2006.
 Volume 4: Reşat Kasaba ed., "Turkey in the Modern World." Cambridge University Press, 2008.
 Agoston, Gabor and Bruce Masters, eds. Encyclopedia of the Ottoman Empire (2008)
 Faroqhi, Suraiya. The Ottoman Empire: A Short History (2009) 196pp
 
 
 
 
 Koller, Markus (2012), Ottoman History of South-East Europe , EGO - European History Online , Mainz: Institute of European History , retrieved: March 25, 2021 (pdf).
 
  Two volumes.
 Kia, Mehrdad, ed. The Ottoman Empire: A Historical Encyclopedia (2 vol 2017)
 McCarthy, Justin. The Ottoman Turks: An Introductory History to 1923. (1997) The Ottoman Turks : an introductory history to 1923 online[
 Mikaberidze, Alexander. Conflict and Conquest in the Islamic World: A Historical Encyclopedia (2 vol 2011)
 Miller, William. The Ottoman Empire and its successors, 1801–1922 (2nd ed 1927) online, strong on foreign policy
 Quataert, Donald. The Ottoman Empire, 1700–1922. 2005. .
 Şahin, Kaya. "The Ottoman Empire in the Long Sixteenth Century." Renaissance Quarterly (2017) 70#1: 220–234 online
 Somel, Selcuk Aksin. Historical Dictionary of the Ottoman Empire (2003). pp. 399 excerpt 
 Stavrianos, L. S. The Balkans since 1453 (1968; new preface 1999) online
 Tabak, Faruk. The Waning of the Mediterranean, 1550–1870: A Geohistorical Approach (2008)

Early Ottomans

Diplomatic and military 
 
 
 Aksan, Virginia H. "Ottoman Military Matters." Journal of Early Modern History 6.1 (2002): 52–62, historiography; online
 Aksan, Virginia H. "Mobilization of Warrior Populations in the Ottoman Context, 1750–1850." in Fighting for a Living: A Comparative Study of Military Labour: 1500–2000 ed. by Erik-Jan Zürcher (2014)online.
 Aksan, Virginia. "Breaking the spell of the Baron de Tott: Reframing the question of military reform in the Ottoman Empire, 1760–1830." International History Review 24.2 (2002): 253–277 online.
 Aksan, Virginia H. "The Ottoman military and state transformation in a globalizing world." Comparative Studies of South Asia, Africa and the Middle East 27.2 (2007): 259–272 online.
 Aksan, Virginia H. "Whatever happened to the Janissaries? Mobilization for the 1768–1774 Russo-Ottoman War." War in History 5.1 (1998): 23–36 online.
 Albrecht-Carrié, René. A Diplomatic History of Europe Since the Congress of Vienna (1958), 736pp; a basic introduction, 1815–1955 online free to borrow
 Çelik, Nihat. "Muslims, Non-Muslims and Foreign Relations: Ottoman Diplomacy." International Review of Turkish Studies 1.3 (2011): 8–30. online 
 Fahmy, Khaled.  All the Pasha's Men: Mehmed Ali, His Army and the Making of Modern Egypt (Cambridge University Press. 1997)
 Gürkan, Emrah Safa (2011), Christian Allies of the Ottoman Empire , EGO - European History Online , Mainz: Institute of European History , retrieved: March 25, 2021 (pdf ).
 Hall, Richard C. ed. War in the Balkans: An Encyclopedic History from the Fall of the Ottoman Empire to the Breakup of Yugoslavia (2014)
 Hurewitz, Jacob C. "Ottoman diplomacy and the European state system." Middle East Journal 15.2 (1961): 141–152. online 
 Merriman, Roger Bigelow. Suleiman the Magnificent, 1520–1566 (Harvard University Press, 1944) online
 Miller, William. The Ottoman Empire and its successors, 1801–1922 (2nd ed 1927) online, strong on foreign policy
 Minawi, Mustafa. The Ottoman Scramble for Africa Empire and Diplomacy in the Sahara and the Hijaz (2016) online
 Nicolle, David. Armies of the Ottoman Turks 1300–1774 (Osprey Publishing, 1983)
 Palmer, Alan. The Decline and Fall of the Ottoman Empire (1994).

Specialty studies 
 Baram, Uzi and Lynda Carroll, editors. A Historical Archaeology of the Ottoman Empire: Breaking New Ground (Plenum/Kluwer Academic Press, 2000)
 Barkey, Karen. Empire of Difference: The Ottomans in Comparative Perspective. (2008) 357pp Amazon.com , excerpt and text search
 Davison, Roderic H. Reform in the Ottoman Empire, 1856–1876 (New York: Gordian Press, 1973)
 Deringil, Selim. The well-protected domains: ideology and the legitimation of power in the Ottoman Empire, 1876–1909 (London: IB Tauris, 1998)
 Findley, Carter V. Bureaucratic Reform in the Ottoman Empire: The Sublime Porte, 1789–1922 (Princeton University Press, 1980)
 McMeekin, Sean. The Berlin-Baghdad Express: The Ottoman Empire and Germany's Bid for World Power (2010)
 Mikhail, Alan. God's Shadow: Sultan Selim, His Ottoman Empire, and the Making of the Modern World (2020) excerpt  on Selim I (1470–1529)
 Pamuk, Sevket. A Monetary History of the Ottoman Empire (1999). pp. 276
 Stone, Norman "Turkey in the Russian Mirror" pp. 86–100 from Russia War, Peace and Diplomacy edited by Mark & Ljubica Erickson, Weidenfeld & Nicolson: London, 2004 .
 Yaycioglu, Ali. Partners of the empire: The crisis of the Ottoman order in the age of revolutions (Stanford University Press, 2016), covers 1760–1820 online review .

Historiography 
 Aksan, Virginia H. "What's Up in Ottoman Studies?" Journal of the Ottoman and Turkish Studies Association 1.1–2 (2014): 3–21. online 
 comment by Ehud R. Toledano  and reply by Aksan 
 Aksan, Virginia H. "Ottoman political writing, 1768–1808." International Journal of Middle East Studies 25.1 (1993): 53–69 online.
 Finkel, Caroline. "Ottoman history: whose history is it?." International Journal of Turkish Studies 14.1/2 (2008).
 Gerber, Haim. "Ottoman Historiography: Challenges of the Twenty-First Century." Journal of the American Oriental Society, 138#2 (2018), p. 369+. online 
 Hartmann, Daniel Andreas. "Neo-Ottomanism: The Emergence and Utility of a New Narrative on Politics, Religion, Society, and History in Turkey" (PhD Dissertation, Central European University, 2013) online .
 Eissenstat, Howard. "Children of Özal: The New Face of Turkish Studies" Journal of the Ottoman and Turkish Studies Association 1#1 (2014), pp. 23–35 DOI: 10.2979/jottturstuass.1.1-2.23 online 
 
 Lieven, Dominic. Empire: The Russian Empire and its rivals (Yale University Press, 2002), comparisons with Russian, British, & Habsburg empires. excerpt 
 Mikhail, Alan; Philliou, Christine M. "The Ottoman Empire and the Imperial Turn," Comparative Studies in Society & History (2012) 54#4 pp. 721–745. Comparing the Ottomans to other empires opens new insights about the dynamics of imperial rule, periodisation, and political transformation
 Olson, Robert, "Ottoman Empire" in 
 Quataert, Donald. "Ottoman History Writing and Changing Attitudes towards the Notion of 'Decline.'" History Compass 1 (2003): 1–9.
 Yaycıoğlu, Ali. "Ottoman Early Modern." Journal of the Ottoman and Turkish Studies Association 7.1 (2020): 70–73 online.
 Yılmaz, Yasir. "Nebulous Ottomans vs. Good Old Habsburgs: A Historiographical Comparison." Austrian History Yearbook 48 (2017): 173–190. Online

External links 

 Ottoman Text Archive Project – University of Washington
 Searchable Ottoman texts – Wikilala
 American Travelers to the Holy Land in the 19th Century  Shapell Manuscript Foundation
 The Ottoman Empire: Resources – University of Michigan
 Turkey in Asia, 1920

 
1299 establishments in Asia
1923 disestablishments in Asia
1923 disestablishments in Europe
Overseas empires
States and territories established in 1299
States and territories disestablished in 1922
States and territories disestablished in 1923
Former countries in the Middle East
Former countries in the Balkans
Former countries in Africa
Former monarchies of Europe
Former countries of the interwar period
Historical transcontinental empires